The long-whiskered owlet (Xenoglaux loweryi) is a tiny owl that is endemic to a small area in the Andean mountains in Amazonas and San Martín in northern Peru. It is restricted to cloud forests with dense undergrowth and epiphytes at about  asl.

The long-whiskered owlet is mainly brown with a whitish belly and eyebrow. The large eyes are orange-brown. Although it has no ear tufts, this small owl's facial feathers extend out past its head, making it appear to have long tufts. The name of its monotypic genus Xenoglaux means "strange owl" and—among others—refers to these long facial feathers. Only the heavier Tamaulipas pygmy owl and the lighter-weight elf owl are of a similar diminutive length. It probably feeds on insects.

Very little is known about this species. It has been captured in 1976 in mist nets on three occasions in San Martín. It had never been observed under normal circumstances until early 2007 when rangers and researchers working in the Area de Conservación Privada de Abra Patricia-Alto Nieva encountered it three times during daylight hours and recorded its calls during the night (American Bird Conservancy, 2007). In addition to later records from the same general area, the long-whiskered owlet has been observed several times at La Esperanza in the Amazonas Department, where first discovered in January 2010. This locality also holds the critically endangered yellow-tailed woolly monkey.

Due to its rarity, restricted habitat, and ongoing deforestation within its tiny range, it is currently considered endangered by BirdLife International. It is estimated that the total population is between 250 and 1000 individuals. The recently established Area de Conservación Privada Abra Patricia-Alto Nieva and the Area de Conservación Privada Copallín (ACP-Copallín) protect important sites for the owlet and other species restricted to this region, including Johnson's tody-tyrant, the royal sunangel, and the ochre-fronted antpitta.

In La Esperanza, the creation of a community-run conservation area, supported by community-based tourism is intended to ensure the survival of this and other endemic species.

A molecular phylogenetic study of the owls published in 2019 found that the long-whiskered owlet is a sister species to the North American elf owl (Micrathene whitneyi).

References
 BirdLife Species Factsheet
 Associated Press (AP) (2007): Tiny Rare Owl Spotted in Peru Reserve. Version of 2007-MAR-27. Retrieved 2007-APR-01.
 BirdLife International (2007): Long-whiskered Owlet puts on a show. Version of 2007-MAR-27. Retrieved 2007-APR-01.
 Neotropical Primate Conservation (2010): Long-Whiskered Owlet in La Esperanza. Version of 2010-FEB-4. Retrieved 2010-MAY-29.
Haaretz,  (2010): Night of the Lechusita. Version of 2010-APR-01. Retrieved 2010-MAY-29.

External links
 Sound recordings of the voice of the Long-whiskered Owlet. xeno-canto.org

long-whiskered owlet
Birds of the Peruvian Andes
Endemic birds of Peru
long-whiskered owlet